Maroochydore Australian Football Club is an Australian rules football club based at Maroochydore on the Sunshine Coast, Queensland which competes in AFL Queensland leagues in South East Queensland. Their men's team have been playing in the QAFL since 2020 and their women's team have been playing in the QAFLW since 2017.

History

Origins 
The Maroochydore Australian Football Club was formed to compete in the Sunshine Coast Australian Football League. This was an amateur competition that was formed in 1970 and continued until 1992. Other foundation clubs were Noosa and Nambour.
 
In 1993, the clubs from the competition played in the Brisbane Australian Football League, and later split up into various AFL South Queensland Divisions.

Queensland League
In 1998 Maroochydore was elevated to the major state competition in Queensland, in 32 matches Maroochydore won five. At the end of 1999 the Senior club was forced to fold and many players moved to the Northern Eagles.

Merger & demerger
In 2004 Maroochydore had a desire to play in the Pineapple Hotel Cup, to overcome a lack of competitiveness the club opted to merge with the North Shore Jets. Seven years after Maroochydore and Northshore amalgamated for mutual gain in the senior ranks, the former has severed the partnership and gone it alone.
 
The decision to de-amalgamate was reached when Maroochydore held a special general meeting on 29 March. The new entity would be known as the Maroochydore Australian Football Club, or the Roos. That was the name of the club when it folded at the end of the 1999 season, before its rebirth as Maroochy Northshore for the start of the 2005 season. Northshore would be known as the Northshore Jets Australian Football Club.

Recent season results

Men's

Women's

Premiers

Men's
 Sunshine Coast AFL (11): 1970, 1971, 1972, 1974, 1978, 1979, 1982, 1983, 1984, 1986, 1989
 Brisbane AFL (4): 1993, 1994, 1995, 1996
 QFA Division 1 (2): 2017, 2018

Women's
QWAFA (1): 2016

Current squad

AFL Players from Maroochydore

AFL
Nathan Clarke – Brisbane Lions (2000–2002)
Josh Drummond – Brisbane Lions (2005–2012)
Noah Cumberland – Richmond (2020–present)
Carter Michael – Brisbane Lions (2022–present)

AFLW
Shannon Campbell – Brisbane Lions (2017–present)
Tahlia Randall – Brisbane Lions (2017–2018), North Melbourne (2019–present)
Belle Dawes – Brisbane Lions (2020–present)
Lily Postlethwaite – Brisbane Lions (2020–present)
Kate Surman – Gold Coast (2020–2022), Port Adelaide (2022–present)
Jacqueline Dupuy – Gold Coast (2022–present)
Maggie Harmer – Brisbane Lions (2022–present)
Mikayla Pauga – Brisbane Lions (2022–present)
Bella Smith – Brisbane Lions (2022–present)
Kiara Hillier – Brisbane Lions (2022–present)

References

External links
 Official website

Queensland State Football League clubs
Maroochydore